Transgressive Records is an independent record label based in London, formed in 2004. Its founders, Tim Dellow and Toby L, first met at a Bloc Party gig organised by Toby's Rockfeedback website.

The label's debut release was "1am" by the Subways in September 2004, quickly followed by singles from Mystery Jets, the Young Knives and Regina Spektor. Artists on its roster include Flume, Sophie, Arlo Parks, Alvvays, Julia Jacklin, Hippo Campus and Songhoy Blues.

The company has also formed Transgressive Management, looking after Johnny Flynn, Blaenavon, Marika Hackman and Let's Eat Grandma, and a publishing company, working with Foals, Loyle Carner, Benny Mails, Odetta Hartman and more.

Artists

Transgressive Records

Africa Express 
Alvvays 
The Antlers
Arlo Parks
At the Drive In 
Beverly Glenn-Copeland
Blaenavon
Cosmo Sheldrake
Damon Albarn
Flume
Foals

Johnny Flynn
Hippo Campus
Julia Jacklin
Let's Eat Grandma 
The Moonlandingz
Mutual Benefit 
Neon Indian 
Peter Silberman
Songhoy Blues 
Stargaze

Transgressive Publishing

Blaenavon
Benny Mails
Great Good Fine Ok
Loyle Carner
Marika Hackman
Odetta Hartman
Two Door Cinema Club

Transgressive Management

Johnny Flynn
Blaenavon
Marika Hackman
Let's Eat Grandma

paradYse records
Blaenavon
Calpurnia
Cosmo Sheldrake
Favela
Flyte
Loyle Carner
Marika Hackman
Spring King
Theme Park
Toothless
Thumpers

Past artists

Bloc Party
Calpurnia
Circa Waves
Dry the River
Esser
Famy
Gaggle
Gengahr
Graham Coxon
Iron & Wine
Jeremy Warmsley
Ladyfuzz
Larrikin Love

Liam Finn
Miles Benjamin Anthony Robinson
Mystery Jets
Noisettes
Ox.Eagle.Lion.Man
Pulled Apart by Horses
Regina Spektor
Sophie
The Pipettes
The Rumble Strips
The Shins
The Subways
Young Knives

See also
 List of record labels

References

External links
 

Record labels established in 2004
British independent record labels
Indie rock record labels
Alternative rock record labels